Zetex may refer to either:

 Zetex (fabric), a range of high-temperature resistant fabrics
 Zetex Semiconductors, a transistor and diode manufacturer, once part of Ferranti.